NIMA or Nima may refer to:

Places 
 Nima, Accra, a residential town in the Greater Accra Region of Ghana
 Nima, Shimane, a former town in Japan, merged into the city of Ōda
 Nima District, Shimane, a former district that included the town
 Nima, a village in Mintiu Gherlii Commune, Cluj County, Romania
 Nima, a tributary of the river Someșul Mic in Cluj County, Romania
 Nima, Gansu, a village in Gansu, China.

People 
 Nima (name), a given name
 Nima (politician) (born 1978/1979), Bhutanese politician

Other 
 National Imagery and Mapping Agency, now the National Geospatial-Intelligence Agency, a U.S. government agency
 National Indigenous Music Awards held annually in the Northern Territory of Australia
 Nima (device), a portable food sensor for detecting protein allergens
 Nima (film), or Thread, a 2016 Greek film

See also 
 National Instructional Materials Accessibility Standard (NIMAS)
 Nema (disambiguation)